Wonderful Things! is a 1958 British comedy romance film  directed by Herbert Wilcox and starring Frankie Vaughan, Jocelyn Lane and Wilfrid Hyde-White. It was written by Jack Trevor Story. The screenplay concerns two fishermen brothers who clash over the love of a woman.

Cast
 Frankie Vaughan ...  Carmello
 Jeremy Spenser ...  Mario
 Jocelyn Lane ...  Pepita (as Jackie Lane)
 Wilfrid Hyde-White ...  Sir Bertram
 Jean Dawnay ...  Anne
 Eddie Byrne ...  Harry
 Harold Kasket ...  Poppa
 Christopher Rhodes ...  Codger
 Nancy Nevinson ...  Mamma
 Cyril Chamberlain ...  Butler
 Barbara Goalen ...  Courtesy Appearance
 Liz Fraser ... Minor role
 Ronnie Barker ... Minor role

The film marked the film debut of comedian Ronnie Barker, in an uncredited role as a waiter.

Critical reception
Sky Movies wrote, "If you can believe in Frankie Vaughan and Jeremy Spenser as Gibraltar fishermen, you'll enjoy this Anna Neagle-produced trifle about love and life, Latin-style. Fiery Jackie Lane eclipses model Jean Dawnay's screen debut"; while TV Guide called the film an "engaging romance"; and AllMovie wrote: "Wilfred Hyde-White offers the film's best performance as the debutante's dry-witted papa."

References

External links

1958 films
1958 romantic comedy films
Films shot at Associated British Studios
Films directed by Herbert Wilcox
British romantic comedy films
1950s English-language films
1950s British films